Under Texas Skies may refer to:

Under Texas Skies (1930 film), an American film directed by J.P. McGowan
Under Texas Skies (1940 film), an American film directed by George Sherman